Ololygon littoreus is a species of frog in the family Hylidae.
It is endemic to Brazil.
Its natural habitat is subtropical or tropical moist lowland forests.
It is threatened by habitat loss.

References

littoreus
Endemic fauna of Brazil
Amphibians described in 1988
Taxonomy articles created by Polbot